Brass Tacks was an influential BBC TV documentary programme on BBC from 1977 to 1988. Presenters included Brian Trueman, Eric Robson, David Dimbleby, John Ware and John Harrison.

The first episode, aired on 6 July 1977, featured a debate as to whether or not the Moors murderer Myra Hindley should be considered for parole from the life sentence she had received more than a decade earlier.

References

External links
 
 

BBC television documentaries
1977 British television series debuts
1988 British television series endings
Investigative documentary television series